Janez Gorišek (born September 13, 1933) is a Slovenian civil engineer, constructor, and architect, who holds a degree from the Faculty of Civil Engineering and Geodesy at the University of Ljubljana. His works are mainly constructions of ski jumping and ski flying hills worldwide; his best-known work being the Gorišek Brothers Ski Flying Hill (Letalnica bratov Gorišek) in Planica, Slovenia, which was the world's second-largest ski flying hill. He drew profile for renovated Planica flying hill with help of his son. Since 2015, hill is again largest in the world.. He also participated in the ski jumping event at the 1956 Winter Olympics.

Completed works
  Kulm – Bad Mitterndorf, Austria (enlarged/renovated)
1967–1969:  Letalnica Bratov Gorišek – Planica, Slovenia
1973         :   Heini-Klopfer-Shanze – Oberstdorf, Germany (enlarged/renovated)
1982–1984:  Igman Olympic Ski Jumping Center  – Igman, Bosnia and Herzegovina
1987–1989:  Große Olympiaschanze – Garmisch-Partenkirchen, Germany (enlarged/renovated)
2009–2010:  Kiremittepe Ski Jump – Erzurum, Turkey
2010–2011:  Vikersundbakken – Vikersund, Norway (enlarged/renovated)
 2013:  Letalnica Bratov Gorišek, Nordijski center Planica - Slovenia
 2014:  Kulm – Bad Mitterndorf, Austria (profile/renovated)

References

1933 births
Living people
Architects from Ljubljana
Engineers from Ljubljana
University of Ljubljana alumni
Slovenian male ski jumpers
Olympic ski jumpers of Yugoslavia
Ski jumpers at the 1956 Winter Olympics